The Jackpot is a 1950 American comedy film directed by Walter Lang, with James Stewart and Barbara Hale in the lead roles. It features a young Natalie Wood.

The screenplay was based on a John McNulty article, "The Jackpot", in The New Yorker (February 19, 1949), about the true experiences of James P. Caffrey of Wakefield, Rhode Island who won $24,000 worth of merchandise on August 28, 1948 from the CBS radio quiz program, Sing It Again.

The film is mostly forgotten today, but was a successful vehicle for Stewart at the time. A radio adaptation, broadcast April 26, 1951, on NBC's Screen Directors Playhouse, received much press coverage because Stewart's co-star was Margaret Truman, making her debut as a radio actress for a fee of $2,500. She received mixed reviews, and noted that her father "enjoyed it".

Plot
Bill Lawrence (Stewart), employed at a department store in the Midwestern United States, supports a wife (Hale) and two teenage kids (Wood, Tommy Rettig) on an annual salary of $7,500. Answering a phone call, he wins $24,000 worth of merchandise from a radio quiz program and is overwhelmed by prizes which range from the useful to the absurd, including a side of beef, 7,500 cans of soup, 1,000 fruit trees, a Palomino pony, a portable swimming pool, a diamond ring, a French maid, an interior decorator (Alan Mowbray) and portrait painter Hilda Jones (Patricia Medina).

All is well until Lawrence is told he must sell the prizes in order to pay an income tax of $7000. When he tries to raise the money by selling the merchandise at the department store, his boss (Fred Clark) fires him. When he tries to fence the diamond ring in Chicago, he's arrested. Complicating matters, his wife suspects him of having an affair with Greenwich Village artist Hilda. Dealing with these problems, he gets help from reporter Harry Summers (James Gleason), who had been writing newspaper articles about Lawrence and his winnings. Bandleader Harry James made an uncredited appearance as a radio vocalist.

Cast
 James Stewart as William J. 'Bill' Lawrence
 Barbara Hale as Amy Lawrence
 James Gleason as Harry Summers
 Fred Clark as Mr. Andrew J. Woodriff
 Alan Mowbray as Leslie
 Patricia Medina as Hildegarde Jonet
 Natalie Wood as Phyllis Lawrence
 Tommy Rettig as Tommy Lawrence
 Robert Gist as Pete Spooner
 Lyle Talbot as Fred Burns

Awards
Scripters Henry and Phoebe Ephron, the parents of eventual writer/director Nora Ephron, were nominated for a Writers Guild of America Award.

Home media
The film was released to DVD via the manufacture on demand (MOD) 20th Century Fox Cinema Archives on December 6, 2012.

See also
Champagne for Caesar
Take It or Leave It
Quiz Show

References

External links 

1950 films
1950 comedy films
20th Century Fox films
American black-and-white films
American comedy films
Films about radio
Films based on newspaper and magazine articles
Films directed by Walter Lang
Films scored by Lionel Newman
Films set in department stores
Films set in Indiana
Films about quizzes and game shows
1950s English-language films
1950s American films